Zachary Adam Whedon (born August 14, 1979) is an American screenwriter, film director, and comic book writer.

Early life
Whedon is from a family of writers: he is the son of screenwriter Tom Whedon, grandson of screenwriter John Whedon, and the brother of screenwriter/musician Jed Whedon and producer/director/writer Joss Whedon.

He graduated in 2002 with a film degree from Wesleyan University where he served as president of the Eclectic Society.

Career
His first professional work in television was as a production assistant on his brother Joss' series Angel.

Whedon joined the crew of the HBO western drama Deadwood as an assistant to executive producer David Milch for the first season in 2004. The series was created by Milch and focused on a growing town in the American West. Whedon returned as Milch's assistant for the second season in 2005. He also became a writer for the third and final season in 2006 when he co-wrote the episode "Amateur Night" with writer's assistant Nick Towne. Whedon and the writing staff were nominated for a Writers Guild of America Award for Outstanding Drama Series at the February 2007 ceremony for their work on the third season.

He also wrote and acted in an episode of Milch's next series John from Cincinnati.

Alongside his brothers Joss and Jed, he co-created and co-wrote the parody musical Dr. Horrible's Sing-Along Blog. He has worked on the FOX science-fiction series Fringe and the AMC drama Rubicon.

In Jan 2014, Dark Horse Comics released Serenity: Leaves on the Wind, a six-issue comic book series written by Whedon with art by Georges Jeanty that continues the story of brother Joss's cult television show Firefly, and its subsequent film adaptation Serenity. The comic is also executive produced by Joss Whedon and continues the story roughly 39 weeks after the events of the film. He is also a producer of the SundanceTV drama The Red Road and the AMC drama Halt and Catch Fire.

Personal life
In 2012, Whedon married screenwriter and playwright Eliza Clark. The two met while writing for the TV series Rubicon.

Filmography

Film
Director
 Come and Find Me (2016)

Writer
 Come and Find Me (2016)

Television
Writer

References

External links
 

Wesleyan University alumni
Living people
1979 births
American television writers
American male television writers
American comics writers
Place of birth missing (living people)
American screenwriters
American film directors
Hugo Award-winning writers
Whedon family